Lindley Swifts are an amateur Rugby league club based in Lindley, West Yorkshire. Their home ground is Birchencliffe Cricket Club, in Birchencliffe, Huddersfield. The open age team currently play in Premier Division in the Pennine League.

History 
The club had been most successful during its period in the amateur leagues, in the years between 1884, up to the 1938-39 season; the season in which they disbanded. Lindley Swifts played in the Leeds & Districts League against clubs like Sharlston Rovers. They played in this league because the team was open age and the Huddersfield & Districts League at that time was an under 21 age group. The club played in black and white hoops, the same colours that they play in today. Lindley lost 32-2 to St. Helens in the first round of the Challenge Cup in 1928–29. In the 1930–31 Challenge Cup, they played Rochdale Hornets and lost 13-2 in the first round. In 1939 the pitch was turned into an allotment to grow vegetables for World War II. It is believed that the Huddersfield Royal Infirmary stands where the ground used to be.

In January 2001, Lindley Swifts won the 2000-01 Yorkshire Cup, beating Hunslet Warriors 16-11, at Featherstone Rovers', Post Office Road.

Teams 
Lindley Swifts run an open age team, a women's team, U11's, U9's and U7's, all of the junior teams competing in the Yorkshire Junior League.

Notable players
Mark Burns, Scotland international

Dave Valentine, grandson of Dave Valentine, Great Britain captain and World Cup winner, played for Scotland Students

Anthony Simpson also played for Huddersfield RLFC

Craig Robertson also played for Sheffield Eagles

Craig Blackburn also played for {Accrington Stanley and West bowling 3rd team as well as posing as a pro rugby league player }

Gary Senior also played for Huddersfield RLFC

Honours
 BARLA Yorkshire Cup
 Winners (1): 2000–01

External links 
 Lindley Swifts website
 http://www.pennineleague.co.uk/club/6412

Rugby league teams in West Yorkshire
Rugby clubs established in 1884
1939 disestablishments in England